Aboriginal History is an annual peer-reviewed academic journal published as an open access journal by Aboriginal History Inc. It was established in 1977 (co-founded and edited by Diane Barwick) and covers interdisciplinary historical studies in the field of the interactions between Australian Aboriginal and Torres Strait Islander peoples and non-Indigenous peoples. The Journal has been described as "... a flagship of the field of Australian Aboriginal history."

The journal's scope includes the areas of Australian Indigenous history and oral histories, languages, biographies, bibliographic guides and archival research. It has also brought previously unpublished manuscripts and research in the fields of Australian archaeology, anthropology, linguistics, demography, sociology, law and geography to the professional and wider public. A focus on cultural, political and economic history is complemented by critiques of current events of relevance to Aboriginal and Torres Strait Islander culture and society.

The journal is co-published by ANU Press, an open access academic publisher located at the Australian National University in Canberra, Australia. The journal is fully accessible online from the ANU Press website.

Aboriginal History Inc., the journal's publisher, also publishes monographs on a wide range of topics in Aboriginal and Torres Strait Islander histories. Since 2006 the monographs have been available through the website of open access co-publisher, ANU Press.

References

External links 
 
 Open access to journal through co-publisher ANU Press
 Open access to monographs through co-publisher ANU Press

Anthropology journals
Archaeology of Australia
Oceanian archaeology
Australian studies journals
Annual journals
English-language journals
Publications established in 1977